Ozark Regional Transit is the provider of mass transportation in the Northwest Arkansas region, including Fayetteville, Springdale, Rogers, and Bentonville.

History
The roots of the organization are in a 1974 project by the Economic Opportunity Agency of Washington County to provide rural transportation. By 1978, two fixed routes had been established and, in 1982, after being designated as an urban area, northwestern Arkansas formed Ozark Regional Transit and acquired federal funding. Currently, 5 local routes serve the interconnected Fayetteville and Springdale communities and two routes travel through the Rogers-Bentonville area. A commuter route travels once per day in each direction to provide a peak connection between Fayetteville and rural Washington County, while another commuter route travels all day between the four major cities.

Fire
In January 2017, an explosion and subsequent fire destroyed 20 ORT buses, leaving only six functional buses in the fleet. In the subsequent weeks, transit services from around the country donated buses to ORT to restore their fleet, including Dallas Area Rapid Transit, Key West Transit, Port Authority of Allegheny County, Razorback Transit, and Rural Transit Enterprises Coordinated, with many other lending buses until the fleet could be restored.

Routes
 Route 1 - Fayetteville
 Route 2 - Fayetteville
 Route 3 - Fayetteville/Johnson
 Route 4 - Fayetteville
 Route 11 - Bentonville
 Route 51 - Rogers
 Route 52 - Rogers
 Route 61 - Springdale
 Route 62 - Springdale
 Route 63 - Springdale/Johnson
 Route 64 - Springdale
 Route 490 - I-49 Express
 Commuter Express - Arkansas Archaeological Survey to Walmart Home Office, Bentonville, Arkansas

References

Bus transportation in Arkansas
Fayetteville, Arkansas
Springdale, Arkansas
Transit agencies in Arkansas